Phalaenopsis mariae is a species of orchid found from Sabah, Borneo to the Mindanao island, Philippines.

External links 
 
 

mariae
Orchids of the Philippines